Dreamer is the ninth solo studio album by American blues singer Bobby Bland. It was released in 1974 through ABC/Dunhill Records. Recording sessions took place at ABC Recording Studios in Los Angeles with songwriter and record producer Steve Barri. The album charted at number 172 on the Billboard 200 and at number 5 on the Top R&B/Hip-Hop Albums in the United States. It spawned three hit singles: "Ain't No Love in the Heart of the City", "I Wouldn't Treat a Dog (The Way You Treated Me)" and "Yolanda".

Track listing

Personnel 

 Robert Calvin 'Bobby "Blue" Bland' Brooks – lead vocals
 Maxine Willard Waters – backing vocals
 Julia Tillman Waters – backing vocals
 Ginger Blake – backing vocals
 Michael Omartian – piano, organ, clavinet, Arp synthesizer, blues harp, arrangement
 Larry Carlton – guitar
 Dean Parks – guitar
 Ben Benay – guitar
 Wilton Felder – bass
 Ed Greene – drums
 Jackie Kelso – horns
 Ernest James Watts – horns
 Lewis Melvin McCreary – horns
 Pete Christlieb – horns
 James Ronald Horn – horns
 Paul J. Hubinon – horns
 Tony Terran – horns
 The Sid Sharp Strings – strings
Technical
 Steve Barri – producer
 Roger Scott Nichols – engineering
 Howard Gayle – engineering
 Phil Kaye – engineering
 Earl Klasky – design
 Ken Veeder – photography

Chart history 

 Album

 Singles

References

External links 

1974 albums
Bobby Bland albums
ABC Records albums
Dunhill Records albums
Albums produced by Steve Barri